The Cathedral of the Annunciation is a Catholic cathedral in Stockton, California, United States. It is the seat of the Diocese of Stockton.

Archbishop John J. Mitty of San Francisco approved the building of a new parish in the north side of Stockton in 1941. As the population of the city was growing to the north, the decision was made to build a "new" St. Mary's, and then eventually tear down the "old" St. Mary's downtown that had been built in 1893 and was in bad need of repair. Monsignor William E. McGough was the first pastor of the "new" St. Mary's. He worked with San Francisco architect Henry A. Minton and Stockton contractors Shepherd and Green to construct the modified-Gothic church. The building permit for the church was issued on March 5, 1941, for a building that would cost $175,000 and take approximately one year to build. As the Second World War began, the pace of building slowed but did not stop. The building had been fully paid for before construction was finished and the total cost was $285,000. The church was dedicated on December 12, 1942.

The church is constructed of reinforced concrete, then faced with brick and ornamented with cast stone. The overall treatment is Gothic. A ninety-two-foot belfry tower is located in the northeast corner. Limestone steps lead to the entrance, which has a vaulted ceiling and terrazzo floor.

See also
List of Catholic cathedrals in the United States
List of cathedrals in the United States

References

External links

Official Cathedral Site
Roman Catholic Diocese of Stockton Official Site

Christian organizations established in 1942
Roman Catholic churches completed in 1942
20th-century Roman Catholic church buildings in the United States
Annunciation, Stockton
Roman Catholic Diocese of Stockton
Culture of Stockton, California
Churches in San Joaquin County, California
Gothic Revival church buildings in California
Buildings and structures in Stockton, California
1942 establishments in California